Roland Bhola (born 5 September 1967) is a politician from Grenada. He has served in the Senate of Grenada, and has been the island's Minister of Sport on multiple occasions. He is a member of the New National Party.

References
Candidate profile on party website

1967 births
Living people
Members of the Senate of Grenada
Members of the House of Representatives of Grenada
Government ministers of Grenada
New National Party (Grenada) politicians
Place of birth missing (living people)